This is part of a list of Statutes of New Zealand for the period of the Fifth Labour Government of New Zealand up to and including part of the first year of the Fifth National Government of New Zealand.

2000s

2000  

 Archives, Culture, and Heritage Reform Act 
 Bail Act  Amended: 2002/03/07
 Employment Relations Act  Amended: 2004/06/07
 Energy Efficiency and Conservation Act 
 Hauraki Gulf Marine Park Act  Amended: 2001
 Industry New Zealand Act 
 International Crimes and International Criminal Court Act  Amended: 2002
 Ministry of Economic Development Act 
 Modern Apprenticeship Training Act 
 Museum of Transport and Technology Act 
 New Zealand - Singapore Closer Economic Partnership Act 
 New Zealand Public Health and Disability Act  Amended: 2003/05
 Nurse Maude Association Act 
 Pardon for Soldiers of the Great War Act 
 Pouakani Claims Settlement Act 
 Protected Disclosures Act 
 The Statutes of New Zealand Local Act No 1 
 The Statutes of New Zealand Private Acts Nos 1-2 
Plus 75 Acts amended and 1 Act repealed.

2001  

 Dairy Industry Restructuring Act 2001 
 Education Standards Act 
 Habeas Corpus Act 
 Injury Prevention, Rehabilitation, and Compensation Act  Amended: 2003/05/07
 Local Electoral Act  Amended: 2002/04/06
 New Zealand Superannuation Act 2001  Amended heaps
 Public Audit Act 
 Public Trust Act 
 Sydenham Money Club Act 
 Taranaki Regional Council Empowering Act 
 The Statutes of New Zealand Local Acts Nos 1-6 
 Tutae-Ka-Wetoweto Forest Act 
Plus 55 Acts amended and 1 Act repealed.

2002 
As Enacted
 Cadastral Survey Act  Amended: 2005
 Chartered Professional Engineers of New Zealand Act 
 Civil Defence Emergency Management Act 
 Climate Change Response Act  Amended: 2006
 Construction Contracts Act  Amended: 2003
 Crown Organisations (Criminal Liability) Act 2002
 Electronic Transactions Act 
 Hawke's Bay Endowment Land Empowering Act 
 New Zealand Stock Exchange Restructuring Act 
 Parole Act  Amended: 2006/07
 Pitcairn Trials Act 
 Royal New Zealand Foundation of the Blind Act 
 Sentencing Act  Amended: 2003/04/06/07
 Sport and Recreation New Zealand Act 
 Te Uri o Hau Claims Settlement Act 
 Terrorism Suppression Act  Amended: 2003/05/07
 Tower Trust Limited Act 
 Victims' Rights Act 
 Weathertight Homes Resolution Services Act 
Plus 43 Acts amended

2003  

 Auckland War Memorial Museum Site Empowering Act 
 Children's Commissioner Act 
 Credit Contracts and Consumer Finance Act 
 Families Commission Act 
 Gambling Act  Amended: 2005
 Government Communications Security Bureau Act 
 Health Practitioners Competence Assurance Act 
 Hop Industry Restructuring Act 
 Land Transport Management Act  Amended: 2004
 Motor Vehicle Sales Act  Amended: 2005
 New Zealand Trade and Enterprise Act 
 Ngati Ruanui Claims Settlement Act 
 Ngati Tama Claims Settlement Act 
 Prostitution Reform Act 
 Retirement Villages Act  Amended: 2005/07
 Social Workers Registration Act 
 Te Whanau-a-Taupara Trust Empowering Act 
 Television New Zealand Act 
 Wine Act 2003  Amended: 2005
 Wool Industry Restructuring Act 
Plus 82 Acts amended and 2 Acts repealed.

2004  

 Care of Children Act  Amended: 2005/07
 Civil Union Act  Amended: 2007
 Corrections Act  Amended: 2005
 Crown Entities Act 
 Foreshore and Seabed Act 
 Human Assisted Reproductive Technology Act  Amended: 2007
 Judicial Conduct Commissioner and Judicial Conduct Panel Act 
 Maori Commercial Aquaculture Claims Settlement Act  Amended: 2006
 Maritime Security Act 
 Secondhand Dealers and Pawnbrokers Act 
 The Statutes of New Zealand Local Acts Nos 1-2 
Plus 77 Acts amended

2005  

 Charities Act 
 Ngaa Rauru Kiitahi Claims Settlement Act 
 Ngati Awa Claims Settlement Act 
 Prisoners' and Victims' Claims Act  Amended: 2007
 Public Records Act 
 Registered Architects Act 
Plus 100 Acts amended

2006  
 Evidence Act 2006
 Epidemic Preparedness Act 
 KiwiSaver Act 
 Lawyers and Conveyancers Act  Amended: 2007
 Manfeild Park Act 
 New Zealand Sign Language Act 
 Ngati Mutunga Claims Settlement Act 
 Rotorua Library Trust Fund Variation Act 
 Southland Agricultural and Pastoral Association Empowering Act 
 Sports Anti-Doping Act 
 Te Arawa Lakes Settlement Act 
 Westpac New Zealand Act 
Plus 67 Acts amended

2007  

 Court Martial Act 
 Electoral Finance Act 
 Immigration Advisers Licensing Act 
 Major Events Management Act 
 Sentencing Council Act 
 Unsolicited Electronic Messages Act 
 Wills Act 2007  Amended: 1955/58/60/62/69/77/2005

2008

 Affiliate Te Arawa Iwi and Hapu Claims Settlement Act 2008
 Affordable Housing: Enabling Territorial Authorities Act 2008
 Appropriation (2008/09 Estimates) Act 2008
 Auckland Regional Amenities Funding Act 2008
 Bishop Suter Art Gallery Governance Restructuring Act 2008
 Central North Island Forests Land Collective Settlement Act 2008
 Christchurch City Council (Lancaster Park) Land Vesting Act 2008
 Criminal Disclosure Act 2008
 Disability (United Nations Convention on the Rights of Persons with Disabilities) Act 2008
 Financial Advisers Act 2008
 Financial Service Providers (Registration and Dispute Resolution) Act 2008
 Human Tissue Act 2008
 Imprest Supply (Second for 2008/09) Act 2008
 Land Transport Management Amendment Act 2008
 Limited Partnerships Act 2008
 Mauao Historic Reserve Vesting Act 2008
 New Zealand Geographic Board (Ngā Pou Taunaha o Aotearoa) Act 2008
 Policing Act 2008
 Public Lending Right for New Zealand Authors Act 2008
 Public Transport Management Act 2008
 Real Estate Agents Act 2008
 Subordinate Legislation (Confirmation and Validation) Act 2008
 Taxation (Limited Partnerships) Act 2008
 Te Roroa Claims Settlement Act 2008
 Waitakere Ranges Heritage Area Act 2008
 Waste Minimisation Act 2008

External links 
The above list may not be current and will contain errors and omissions. For more accurate information try:
 Walter Monro Wilson, The Practical Statutes of New Zealand, Auckland: Wayte and Batger 1867
 The Knowledge Basket: LegislationNZ
 New Zealand Legislation Includes some Imperial and Provincial Acts. Only includes Acts currently in force, and as amended.

Lists of statutes of New Zealand